IRCA may refer to:

 First Nations Media Australia, formerly Indigenous Remote Communications Association
Immigration Reform and Control Act of 1986
Institut royal de la culture amazighe 
International Ragdoll Cat Association
International Railways of Central America, a Guatemalan railway
International Register of Certificated Auditors
IRCA (football club), an association football club in Guatemala belonging to International Railways of Central America